Buddy Complex is a 2014 Japanese mecha anime series produced by Sunrise in collaboration with Bandai Visual, Bandai Channel, Lantis, Banpresto, and Bandai Namco Games under Bandai Namco Holdings. The anime series is original creation of Hajime Yatate and is directed by Yasuhiro Tanabe with series composition by BC project, original character designs and animation direction by Asako Inayoshi and Tomoshige Inayoshi, soundtrack music by Tatsuya Kato and 3D CG by Orange. The series follows Aoba Watase, an ordinary high school boy who lived an average, everyday life commuting to high school in the city. On the first day back after summer break, Aoba is attacked by a giant robot that appears out of the sky. As he's pursued through the city, his classmate Hina Yumihara appears in a giant robot of her own. She rescues him, and tells him cryptically that "Dio is waiting," before she sends Aoba into the future and then disappears. When Aoba wakes up, he finds himself over seventy years into the future, where the Free Pact Alliance and the Zogilia Republic are at war with each other and there he meets young pilot named Dio Jyunyou Weinberg. This begins Aoba's new life as the pilot of the Free Pact Alliance and together with Dio, they would change the fate of the world.

The first part of the series aired 13 episodes between January 5, 2014 and March 30, 2014, every Sunday 24:00 JST on Tokyo MX with later airings on YTV, TVA, BS11 and Bandai Channel. The opening theme is "Unisonia" by True while the ending theme is "Ano Sora ni Kaeru Mirai de" by ChouCho. Funimation streamed the series on their video website, beginning on January 6, 2014. Daisuki streamed the episodes worldwide on their Website as well as on their official YouTube Channel. Bandai Visual will begin releasing the series in Japan on Blu-ray volumes starting on March 26, 2014.

A 2-part sequel titled  aired on September 29 and 30, 2014. The insert song "Twin Bird" performed by True.



Episode list

Home media
Bandai Visual began releasing the series in Japan on Blu-ray volumes starting on March 26, 2014.

References

External links
Official anime website 
Official Funimation website

Buddy Complex